is a manga written and drawn by Shunji Enomoto. It appeared in Kodansha's Weekly Morning from 1997 to 2003 and has been gathered into nine book collections. It is filled with extreme scatological and sexual humor on a gargantuan scale. The series centers on the exploits of the shameless and irresponsible salaryman Gosuke Maeda, his equally unhinged preadolescent son Michiro, and various depraved co-workers, including the obsessive voyeur and exhibitionist Tamura and the unsmiling closet dominatrix Kuzuhara.

Volumes
 Volume 1
 Volume 2
 Volume 3
 Volume 4
 Volume 5
 Volume 6
 Volume 7
 Volume 8
 Volume 9

All volumes above published by Kodansha.

A tribute volume, Enomoto Tribute: Shunji Enomoto and Pleasant People, featuring interpretations of Enomoto's characters by other cartoonists (including Moebius), was released by MouRa in 2006.

International
The series has not been translated into English. Its main source of exposure among English-speaking audiences was an enthusiastic 2001 review by Highwater Books publisher Tom Devlin in The Comics Journal. Devlin marveled at Enomoto's ability to "make innovative comics that are almost entirely concerned with bodily functions," and suggested that it was "entirely unnecessary" to know what the characters were saying to appreciate the series: "Just imagine that every time someone opens their mouth, they scream 'Aaaaaaaaaaaaah!'." Enomoto: New Elements that Shake the World has also been praised by the alternative comics creators Tom Hart and James Kochalka.

Portions of the series have been translated into Italian and Spanish.

References

External links
 A site devoted to the series and its creator [Japanese language]

1997 manga
Comedy anime and manga
Kodansha manga
Seinen manga
Shunji Enomoto